Sticta macrocyphellata is a species of foliose lichen in the family Peltigeraceae. It is found in the Colombian Andes.

Taxonomy

The lichen was formally described as a new species in by lichenologists Bibiana Moncada and Luis Fernando Coca. The species epithet alludes to the dense, sizable  that are highly visible across a significant portion of the underside.

In a time-calibrated chronogram of the phylogeny of the genus Sticta, Sticta macrocyphellata was most closely related to S. dilatata; these two species made up a clade that was sister to a clade containing S. papillata, and a species resembling S. subtomentella.

Habitat and distribution

This species has been recorded on the western slopes of the Cordillera Central, the eastern slopes of the Cordillera Oriental, and the Cordillera Occidental. Sticta macrocyphellata commonly grows on rocks and bark and is often associated with bryophytes such as Plagiochila, Lophocolea, Bazzania, Omphalanthus, and Macromitrium.

References

macrocyphellata

Lichen species
Lichens described in 2013
Lichens of Colombia